Jamalcolm "Jay" Liggins (born 26 April 1996) is an American football defensive back for the Frankfurt Galaxy He played college football at Dickinson State.

Youth and college career
Liggins attended Bismarck High School in North Dakota's capital city. He had also competed in track and field (long jump and triple jump) in high school and college, earning All-American honors. On the football team, he excelled as a senior and became a first-time starter for the Demons and was subsequently selected to the All-Region Team. As a result, he participated in the North Dakota Shrine Bowl in April 2014.

In 2014, Liggins committed to Dickinson State University in of the National Association of Intercollegiate Athletics (NAIA). He sat out his first year as a redshirt. In the following years, he won the conference four times with the Blue Hawks. In 2019, they advanced to the quarterfinals of the NAIA playoffs but were eliminated. During his collegiate career, Liggings was selected to the All-Conference team multiple times and was also named to the Second Team in 2017 and the All-American First Team in 2018. In addition, he was a finalist for the prestigious Cliff Harris Award. In March 2019, he attended the Pro Day at North Dakota State University and was also named to the All-Conference Team that year.

Professional career

North America
On 28 April 2019, Liggins was signed by the Philadelphia Eagles as an undrafted free agent. He appeared in two games during the preseason, recording four tackles, one tackle for loss, and one pass breakup. He was released by the Eagles in mid-August. Liggins was on the spring 2020 squad of the St. Louis BattleHawks of the XFL, but was released before the start of the season. On 20 February 2020, Liggins was signed by the Winnipeg Blue Bombers of the Canadian Football League (CFL) and released on 30 July 2021. He did not appear in any regular season games for the CFL team.

Europe
Liggins was signed by the Bern Grizzlies for the 2022 Swiss National League A season and won the Swiss Bowl with them. On 4 August, Liggins was introduced by the Raiders Tirol of the European League of Football (ELF) as a new signing midway through the 2022 season. In the remaining four games of the regular season, he recorded nine tackles, two interceptions, and eight pass break-ups. He reached the semifinals with the Raiders, where they lost to the Hamburg Sea Devils. In November 2022, Frankfurt Galaxy announced the signing of Liggins for the 2023 ELF season.

Statistics

Private life
Liggins has ten siblings. He grew up in Memphis, Tennessee and moved with his mother and siblings to Bismarck, North Dakota at the age of eleven. Initially, he sought a career in the U.S. military.

References

1999 births
Living people
American football cornerbacks
Frankfurt Galaxy (ELF) players
American expatriate players of American football
American expatriate sportspeople in Germany
Players of American football from North Dakota
Sportspeople from Bismarck, North Dakota
American expatriate sportspeople in Switzerland
American expatriate sportspeople in Austria
Dickinson State Blue Hawks football players